"Un Corazón" (translated as One Heart) is the third single released by Puerto Rican singer Chelo, from his debut album 360°. The song samples "La Murga" by Héctor Lavoe. It was a moderate success in Europe, however not in the US, where his previous single, "Yummy" performed better.

Charts

2005 songs
2007 singles
Chelo (American singer) songs
Sony BMG Norte singles